Valmy is a commune in the Marne department in north-eastern France.

Geography
The town stands on the west flank of the Argonne massif, midway between Verdun and Paris, near Vouziers.

History
Valmy provided the setting for the Battle of Valmy on 20 September 1792. The largest ship-of-the-line ever constructed, the Valmy, was named after this battle.

See also
Communes of the Marne department

References

External links

 Illustrated article about the Battle of Valmy at 'Battlefields Europe'

Communes of Marne (department)